Zhang Shuang (Western name: Nikki Zhang; born 7 March 1987) is a Chinese ice hockey player, currently playing with the KRS Vanke Rays of the Zhenskaya Hockey League (ZhHL) and with the Chinese national team. She represented China in the women's ice hockey tournament at the 2010 Winter Olympics.

References

External links
 
 
 
 
 

1987 births
Living people
Chinese women's ice hockey defencemen
Ice hockey players at the 2010 Winter Olympics
Olympic ice hockey players of China
Sportspeople from Harbin
Asian Games medalists in ice hockey
Ice hockey players at the 2007 Asian Winter Games
Ice hockey players at the 2011 Asian Winter Games
Medalists at the 2007 Asian Winter Games
Medalists at the 2011 Asian Winter Games
Asian Games bronze medalists for China